Eurohippus is an extinct genus of equid ungulate. Its species were long considered part of Propalaeotherium and Lophiotherium. A pregnant specimen was described in 2015.

References

Eocene horses
Prehistoric horses
Prehistoric placental genera
Extinct mammals of Europe